The WhatsOnStage Awards, founded in 2001 as the Theatregoers' Choice Awards, are a fan-driven set of awards organised by the theatre website WhatsOnStage.com, based on a popular vote recognising performers and productions of English theatre, with an emphasis on London's West End theatre.

The 2019 Whatsonstage Awards, the 19th, took place on Sunday, 3 March 2019 at the Prince of Wales Theatre. The Awards Concert was presented by Vicky Vox and Kobna Holdbrook-Smith, with performances from Carrie Hope Fletcher and the West End casts of Six and Spring Awakening.

The winners and nominees were:

References

British theatre awards